Neripteron is a genus of brackish water and freshwater snails, an aquatic gastropod mollusks in the subfamily Neritininae  of the family Neritidae, the nerites. 

Neripteron auriculatum is the type species of the genus Neripteron.

Species
Species within the genus Neripteron include:
 Neripteron amoenum (Gould, 1847)
 Neripteron auriculatum (Lamarck, 1816)
 Neripteron bensoni (Récluz, 1850)
 Neripteron bicanaliculatum (Récluz, 1843)
 Neripteron cariosum (W. Wood, 1828)
 Neripteron cornucopia (Benson, 1836)
 Neripteron dilatatum (Broderip, 1833)
 Neripteron holosericeum (Garrett, 1872)
 Neripteron lecontei (Récluz, 1853)
 Neripteron mauriciae (Lesson, 1831)
 Neripteron neglectum (Pease, 1861)
 Neripteron obtusum (G. B. Sowerby I, 1836)
 Neripteron pileolus (Récluz, 1850)
 Neripteron platyconcha (Annandale & Prashad, 1919)
 Neripteron rostratum (Reeve, 1856)
 Neripteron rubicundum (Martens, 1875)
 Neripteron simoni (Prashad, 1921)
 Neripteron siquijorense (Récluz, 1844)
 Neripteron spirale (Reeve, 1855)
 Neripteron subauriculatum (Récluz, 1843)
 Neripteron subviolaceum Eichhorst, 2016
 Neripteron taitense (Lesson, 1831)
 Neripteron vespertinum (G. B. Sowerby II, 1849)
 Neripteron violaceum (Gmelin, 1791)
Species brought into synonymy
 Neripteron asperulatum (Récluz, 1843): synonym of Neritina asperulata (Récluz, 1843)
 Neripteron holosericum : synonym of Neripteron holosericeum (Garrett, 1872) (misspelling)
 Neripteron schneideri Riech, 1935: synonym of Neripteron auriculatum (Lamarck, 1816)

References 

 hhorst T.E. (2016). Neritidae of the world. Volume 1. Harxheim: Conchbooks. 695 pp

External links

Neritidae
Taxa named by René Lesson